Trilochan Kumar Srivastava (born 25 July 1956) is an Indian banker. Shri Srivastava assumed charge as executive director of Syndicate Bank on 1 September 2013. Prior to joining Syndicate Bank, Shri. Srivastava was General Manager, Union Bank of India. Shri Srivastava holds Master in Management Studies and Commerce from Banaras Hindu University, Varanasi. In addition, he is also a Certified Associate of Indian Institute of Bankers. Shri Srivastava has been a professional banker for over 37 years of varied experience.

Early life and education
T K Srivastava was born as youngest among seven siblings to Late. Shri M P Srivastava and Late Smt Chandrakali Srivastava. Srivastava was born and brought up in Varanasi, Uttar Pradesh. He did his graduation and post graduation in Commerce from Banaras Hindu University, Varanasi in 1976. Srivastava holds Master in Management Studies and Commerce from Banaras Hindu University, Varanasi.

Career

Union Bank of India (1976–2013) 
T. K. Srivastava started his career in 1976 as Probationary Officer in Union Bank of India, Aurai UP. He worked across Varanasi, Lucknow, Delhi, Mumbai and Bengaluru. Srivastava was elevated to various ranks to the level of General Manager of the Union Bank of India. He worked in various capacities in different Regions of the bank. He was responsible for 100% CBS implementation of Union Bank of India and their sponsored Grameena Banks. He has made huge contribution in creating a stable IT platform for Union Bank of India.

Syndicate Bank (2014–present)
Shri T K Srivastava assumed charge as executive director of Syndicate Bank on 1 September 2013.

Personal life 
Srivastava married Anita on 28 November 1985. They have one daughter.

Awards and milestones 
 Best Middleware Implementation Award

References 

 Jan Dhan Yojna

1956 births
Indian bankers
Living people